The Lanyu scaly-toed gecko (Lepidodactylus yami) is a species of lizard in the family Gekkonidae. The species is endemic to Orchid Island (=), Taiwan.

Etymology
The specific name, yami, is in honor of the Yami people, who is the indigenous group to Orchid Island.

Reproduction
L. yami is oviparous. It gives birth to a specific number of two attached eggs each time during reproduction.

References

Further reading
Ota H (1987). "A New Species of Lepidodactylus (Gekkonidae: Reptilia) from Lanyu Island, Taiwan". Copeia 1987 (1): 164–169. (Lepidodactylus yami, new species).
Rösler H (2000). "Kommentierte Liste der rezent, subrezent und fossil bekannten Geckotaxa (Reptilia: Gekkonomorpha)". Gekkota 2: 28–153. (Lepidodactylus yami, p. 91). (in German).

Lepidodactylus
Reptiles described in 1987
Reptiles of Taiwan
Endemic fauna of Taiwan